The Blackberries were a female vocal trio composed of experienced backing vocalists. They backed various artists, including Pacific Gas & Electric, Humble Pie, Ringo Starr, and Pink Floyd. The Blackberries recorded for Motown's West Coast subsidiary, Mowest and A&M Records.

History 
By 1970, singers Venetta Fields, Sherlie Matthews and Clydie King were in high demand as backing vocalists. Fields was previously an Ikette in The Ike & Tina Turner Revue. King was previously a Raelette, backing Ray Charles. Matthews was a singer-songwriter at Mirwood Records and Motown Records. They joined forces and created the Blackberries, which Matthews named after Motown founder Berry Gordy. Their single "Somebody Up There" (MW 5020F) was intended to be released on Mowest in June 1972, but remained unreleased until Hip-O Select released the compilation album The Complete Motown Singles, Volume 12A: 1972 in 2013. In 1971 DJ Tom Clay hired them in Los Angeles to record for his hit spoken word record "What the World Needs Now Is Love/Abraham, Martin, and John".  Popular YouTube Version

In 1972 Venetta and Clydie were hired by Songwriter/Producer Jimmy Webb to 'help boost' the background vocals on several tracks of The Supremes album The Supremes Produced and Arranged by Jimmy Webb. Years later in his autobiography Webb wrote that he wished he hadn't included extra vocalists because he didn't realise at the time (of the recording sessions) how vocally strong The Supremes (Jean Terrell (lead), Lynda Laurence and Mary Wilson) were. In Mary Wilson's memoir she incorrectly stated that The Blossoms were the session singers (this caused confusion for many years) until both Jean Terrell and Lynda Laurence confirmed in a joint interview that it was definitely Clydie King and Venetta Fields who stood beside them at the recording sessions for the Motown album.

In 1972, Steve Marriott of Humble Pie asked Fields to find two other vocalists for an album session. Fields chose King and Matthews who were both previously with Raeletts to become the Blackberries. They recorded an unreleased Blackberries album with Humble Pie as the backing band. Their single "Twist And Shout" was released on A&M Records in 1973. The Blackberries also provided backing vocals to the Humble Pie album Eat It (1973). When Marriott asked them to tour with Humble Pie, Matthews declined due to personal commitments. Matthews chose Billie Barnum as her replacement. The Blackberries toured with Humble Pie in 1973.

Guitarist David Gilmour of Pink Floyd was friends with Humble Pie drummer Jerry Shirley. Gilmour asked Shirley if the Pink Floyd could hire the Blackberries for two European concert dates; Marriott reluctantly agreed. The Blackberries consisting of Billie Barnum, Venetta Fields and Clydie King toured with Pink Floyd on the Dark Side of the Moon Tour in October 1973. By 1974, the Blackberries were Venetta Fields, Billie Barnum, and Carlena Williams. They appeared on Humble Pie's 1974 album Thunderbox. That year, Pink Floyd's manager invited them to tour with the band. Fields and Williams toured with Pink Floyd on their 1974 French Summer Tour and British Winter Tour later that year. The duo also sang backing vocals on Pink Floyd's 1975 album Wish You Were Here and performed on their North American Tour promoting the album.

Fields and King acted as The Oreos, Barbra Streisand's backing singers, in the musical film, A Star Is Born (1976), and sang on the accompanying soundtrack A Star Is Born.

Discography

Singles 

 1970: Pacific Gas & Electric with The Blackberries – "Are You Ready?" (Columbia 4-45158)
 1973: "Twist And Shout" / "Don't Change On Me" (A&M 1442)
 1974: "Yesterday's Music" / "Life Is Full Of Joy" (A&M 1630-S)

Album appearances 

 1974: Super Soul (Disc-o-Tek) (A&M Records)
 2010: A Cellarful Of Motown! Volume 4 (Motown Records / Universal Records)
 2013:The Complete Motown Singles | Vol. 12A: 1972 (Hip-O Select)

Backing vocal credits 

 1970: Fever Tree – For Sale
 1970: Clydie King – Direct Me
 1970: Pacific Gas & Electric – Are You Ready?
1971: Larry Murray – Sweet Country Suite
 1971: Ronnie Milsap – Ronnie Milsap
 1971: Crabby Appleton – Rotten To The Core!
 1971: PG&E – PG&E
 1971: Tom Clay – "What The World Needs Now Is Love" / "Abraham, Martin And John"
 1971: Rita Coolidge – Rita Coolidge
1971: Hill, Barbata & Ethridge – L.A. Getaway
1971: Hoyt Axton – Joy to the World
 1972: Arlo Guthrie – City Of New Orleans
 1972: Captain Beefheart and The Magic Band – Clear Spot
 1972: Nolan Porter – Nolan
 1973: Humble Pie – Eat It
1973: Sammy Johns – Sammy Johns
1973: Sherman Hayes – Catman
 1973: Diane Kolby – Diane Kolby
 1974: Ringo Starr – Goodnight Vienna
 1974: Humble Pie – Thunderbox
 1975: Pink Floyd – Wish You Were Here
 1977: Steely Dan – Aja

References

External links 

 The Blackberries Credits on AllMusic

African-American girl groups
American soul musical groups
Musical groups from Los Angeles
Columbia Records artists
A&M Records artists
Motown artists
Musical backing groups
American rhythm and blues musical groups